Durjanwas is a village of Salempura Gram Panchayat, and is located in Lalsot Tehsil in Dausa District, Rajasthan, India. Its pin code is 303511.

Geography
It is 329 metres above sea level.

References

 

Villages in Dausa district